Qaleh-ye Qazi (also Romanized as Qal‘eh-ye Qāẕī and Qal‘eh Qāzi; also known as Ghal‘eh Ghazī) is a village in Shamsabad Rural District, in the Central District of Dezful County, Khuzestan Province, Iran. At the 2006 census, its population was 181, in 45 families.

References 

Populated places in Dezful County